Cwmffrwd Halt railway station served the settlement of Victoria Village, near Abersychan,  Torfaen, Wales, from 1912 to 1962 on the Eastern Valley branch of the Monmouthshire Railway and Canal Company network.

History 
The station was opened on 13 July 1912 by the Monmouthshire Railway and Canal Company, later the Great Western Railway. It closed on 30 April 1962.

References 

Disused railway stations in Torfaen
Former Great Western Railway stations
Railway stations in Great Britain opened in 1912
Railway stations in Great Britain closed in 1962
1912 establishments in Wales
1962 disestablishments in Wales